Long Weekend is an Australian psychological thriller film shot in 1977 and first shown in 1978. The film was directed by Colin Eggleston and stars John Hargreaves and Briony Behets.

Plot

The story concerns a couple, Peter (Hargreaves) and Marcia (Behets), who, along with their dog, Cricket, go for a weekend camping trip near the beach. It is plain that there is great tension between the couple although the source is unclear. Marcia, for her part, is not particularly keen on the idea of taking this trip but does so to please Peter. On the way, Peter throws a cigarette butt out the window, accidentally kills a kangaroo, and appears to trespass private property on his approach to a beach that the locals do not seem to know anything about. Once they arrive and set up camp, the couple engages in environmentally destructive actions including the theft and destruction of an eagle's egg, the killing of a dugong, what appears to be the killing of a throng of birds, and the needless partial chopping of trees. Gradually it becomes apparent that the source of this rift is an abortion that Marcia had, possibly in secret, because of it being the result of an affair with another man. As tensions between the couple escalate, nature is not pleased with their environmental wrongdoing and starts to strike back, first by an eagle and possum attacking Peter, and then through more insidious means. The film culminates as Marcia reaches her last straw and steals Peter's car, leaving him stranded at the beach. Both of them are left alone for a night to survive the elements. Peter arms himself with a spear-gun that is shot at some point during his troubled night. The next morning, Peter finds Marcia's body, impaled by his spear, and his car abandoned in what appears to be a mesh of spider webs, which he eventually ditches after getting it stuck in mud. Peter finally finds the main road after hours of searching and steps on to the road to wave down a truck. However, a bird attacks the truck driver before seeing Peter, causing him to lose control, and the truck hits and kills Peter.

Cast
 John Hargreaves – Peter
 Briony Behets – Marcia
 Mike McEwen – Truck Driver
 Roy Day –	Old Man
 Michael Aitkens – Bartender
 Sue Kiss von Soly – City girl

Production
The script was the first feature script written by Everett De Roche, an experienced Australian TV writer. He was inspired by a trip he took on an Easter weekend to an isolated beach in New South Wales:
I started LW as a way to avoid the TV-cop-show doldrums while still convincing myself I was "working". LW was a unique project because I began with no outline, no notes or research, very little idea as to where the story was going, and absolutely zero knowledge of screenplays. I simply started at page 1, scene 1, and made it up as I went. I had only a vague plan to write a kind of environmental horror story. My premise was that Mother Earth has her own auto-immune system, so when humans start behaving like cancer cells, She attacks. I also wanted to avoid a JAWS-like critter film. I wanted the LW beasties to all be benign-looking and not overtly aggressive.
De Roche wrote the script in ten days. He showed it to Colin Eggleston, who had worked with him at Crawfords, and Eggleston decided to make the movie. Funds were obtained from Film Victoria and the Australian Film Commission.

Shooting took place in March–April 1977 in Melbourne and near Bega in south-east New South Wales. The ending was originally different according to De Roche:
 I wrote an enormously complicated sequence for near the end where the animals give Peter a second chance. They want him to wise up, and he is at the point of doing so when he hears a truck in the distance. He dashes off to the highway, and the animals decide there is no hope. Poetically, they leave it to another man to kill him.
However his scene was too difficult to shoot because it involved animals and was cut.

Release
The film premiered at the Sitges Film Festival in October 1978.

The film tied with Invasion of the Body Snatchers to win the Antennae II Award at the Avoriaz Fantastic Film Festival, won the Special Jury Award at 1978's Paris Film Festival and won Best Film, Prize of the International Critics' Jury for director Eggleston and Best Actor for Hargreaves.

It was not released theatrically in Australia until 1979, and was a commercial disappointment.

Critical reception 
AllMovie wrote, "Long Weekend is little more than an extended cautionary tale about the karmic foolishness of disrespecting nature. DVD Times praised the film, and also commented on its obscurity: "when an obviously well made and executed little thriller comes along, an exercise in controlled dread and eerie atmosphere that's really effective, you have to ponder the reasons why the vast majority passed on it. Early Australian cinema seems cursed in this category."

De Roche later expressed some dissatisfaction with the film:
Unfortunately, the bush comes across as a threat too early; it should have emerged as a threat only after the audience had sympathized with the animals. And I don’t think that sympathy is there. Long Weekend would have been much better if the audience had been told at the beginning that Peter and Marcia were going to die. This way, it wouldn’t have had to sympathize with them, and could have concerned itself solely with when this was going to happen. Such is the essence of suspense.

Remake 

In 2008, Australian director Jamie Blanks shot a remake of the film (alternately titled Nature's Grave). The film starred James Caviezel and Claudia Karvan.

See also
Cinema of Australia

References

External links 
 
Long Weekend at Oz Movies
Long Weekend at Australian Screen Online
The Long Weekend at AustLit

1978 films
1970s thriller films
1978 horror films
Australian horror thriller films
Australian independent films
Australian natural horror films
Films set on beaches
Films directed by Colin Eggleston
1978 independent films
1970s English-language films